Dukurs (feminine: Dukure) is a Latvian surname. Individuals with the surname include:

 Dainis Dukurs (born 1954), Latvian bobsledder
 Martins Dukurs (born 1984), Latvian skeleton racer, son of Dainis
 Tomass Dukurs (born 1984), Latvian skeleton racer, son of Dainis

Latvian-language masculine surnames